The 2022–23 Chattanooga Mocs men's basketball team represented the University of Tennessee at Chattanooga in the 2022–23 NCAA Division I men's basketball season. The Mocs, led by first-year head coach Dan Earl, played their home games at McKenzie Arena in Chattanooga, Tennessee, as members of the Southern Conference.

Previous season
They finished the season 27–8, 14–4 in SoCon play to win the regular season SoCon championship. As the No. 1 seed in the SoCon tournament, they defeated The Citadel, Wofford, and Furman to win the tournament championship. As a result, they received the conference's automatic bid to the NCAA tournament as the No. 13 seed in the South Region, where they lost in the first round to Illinois.

Roster

Schedule and results

|-
!colspan=12 style=| Non-conference regular season

|-
!colspan=12 style=| SoCon Regular season

 

|-
!colspan=9 style=| SoCon tournament

Source

See also
 2022–23 Chattanooga Mocs women's basketball

References

Chattanooga Mocs men's basketball seasons
Chattanooga Mocs
Chattanooga Mocs men's basketball
Chattanooga Mocs men's basketball